In the Dream House is a memoir by Carmen Maria Machado. It was published on November 5, 2019, by Graywolf Press.

The book was awarded the 2021 Folio Prize and the 2020 Lambda Literary Award for LGBTQ Nonfiction. It was also longlisted for the 2020 Andrew Carnegie Medal for Excellence in Nonfiction.

Summary
The book details Machado's emotionally, mentally — and at times, physically — abusive relationship with another woman while studying for her MFA at the Iowa Writers' Workshop in Iowa City, Iowa. It is predominantly a second-person narrative, with Machado referring to her victimized self as "you". Machado utilizes a different narrative trope for each chapter. The author never directly names her abuser and only refers to her as "the woman in the dream house".

Plot Summary

In the Dream House begins with Carmen Maria Machado's living situation in Iowa City prior to her meeting the Dream House woman. Carmen shares a small two-bedroom apartment with her roommates John and Laura.

In the first chapter, Machado reflects on her childhood years and tells a story about her time in grade school. Machado then elaborates on experiences in her childhood and environment while growing up. She goes on to discuss instances with her previous lovers, leading up to meeting and falling in love with "the woman in the dream house" who domestically abused her.

Main Characters 
Carmen Maria Machado: Machado is the person the text is centered on. The book is told from her perspective as she recounts her memories of her relationship.

The “woman in the dream house”: This woman is Machado’s ex-girlfriend in the book. Throughout the work, the woman in the dream house abuses Machado; however, she is never directly named.

Val Howlett: Both Carmen Maria Machado and Val Howlett dated the woman who provoked the memoir In The Dream House. At first, the woman in the dream house dated both Machado and Howlett. Eventually, however, the woman in the dream house broke up with Howlett to pursue a monogamous relationship with Machado. After Machado and the "woman in the dream house" broke up, Machado got in touch with Howlett and the two later got married in 2017.

Reception 
On the review aggregator website Book Marks, which assigns individual ratings to book reviews from mainstream literary critics, the book received a cumulative "Rave" rating based on 44 reviews: 32 "Rave" reviews and 12 "Positive" reviews.

Kirkus Reviews gave the book a rave review, calling it a "fiercely honest, imaginatively written, and necessary memoir from one of our great young writers." Similarly, Publishers Weekly gave the book a positive review, calling it "an affecting, chilling memoir about domestic abuse." Parul Sehgal of The New York Times also praised the book, writing, "There is something anxious, and very intriguing, in the degree of experimentation in this memoir, in its elaborately titivated sentences, its thicket of citations."

References

2019 non-fiction books
English-language books
American non-fiction books
American memoirs
Graywolf Press books
LGBT literature in the United States
LGBT autobiographies
Queer literature
Works about violence against women
2010s LGBT literature
Literature by Hispanic and Latino American women